Warren Hugh Twining (January 12, 1876 - July 1946) was Speaker of the Colorado House of Representatives.

Biography
Twining was born in Wisconsin. He would become a physician.

Political career
Twining was a member of the House of Representatives from 1925 to 1934, serving as Speaker from 1933 to 1934. He was a Democrat.

References

People from Wisconsin
Speakers of the Colorado House of Representatives
Democratic Party members of the Colorado House of Representatives
1876 births
1946 deaths